Khvajeh Taun (also Romanized as Khvājeh Ţā‘ūn; also known as Khvājeh Ţāghūn) is a village in Qaleh Hamam Rural District, Salehabad County, Razavi Khorasan Province, Iran. At the 2006 census, its population was 426, in 94 families.

References 

Populated places in   Torbat-e Jam County